Vytautas Babravičius (born 10 March 1952), stage name Simas, is a Lithuanian country and folk rock musician. He is often described as a founder of Lithuanian country music scene.

Musical career
Babravičius began his musical career while studying engineering at a university and playing at student's parties since 1967. In 1979 he founded a country music band Deficitai, that quickly became popular for being different than officially allowed music of the time. Group was dissolved in 1983. Later Babravičius pursued solo career under stage name Simas while working as journalist. In 1987 he founded band Runos and released a LP Vyturėliai jūs mano.

Simas' solo songs were popular during the Singing Revolution.

1996 Simas' issued first country music CD in Lithuania called Ąžuolams, liepoms. Many times he did participate in  Visagino Country music festival.

In 2007 he celebrated his 40th season on the scene.

Awards
Order of the Lithuanian Grand Duke Gediminas

References

Lithuanian rock musicians
Lithuanian journalists
Recipients of the Order of the Lithuanian Grand Duke Gediminas
Living people
1952 births
Lithuanian country singers
Folk singers
People from Alytus District Municipality
20th-century Lithuanian male singers
21st-century Lithuanian male singers